The Airpower Museum is a  aviation museum located near Blakesburg, Iowa on Antique Airfield. The Airpower Museum was founded by Robert L. Taylor and the Antique Airplane Association in 1965 and features various periods of aviation through models, engines, propellers, photos and original art. Approximately 25 aircraft are on display, including warbirds from World War II.

Collection
The Airpower Museum's collection of aircraft includes:
Aeronca C-3
Aeronca K
Aeronca 65CA Super Chief
Aeronca 65TC (0-58B) (L-3B)
Aeronca 7AC Champion
Aeronca 11AC Chief
American Eagle Eaglet B-31
Anderson Model Z
Arrow Sport F
Backstrom EPB-1 Flying Plank
BD-5
Bölkow Bo 208A-1 Junior
Bounsall Super Prospector
Brewster-Fleet B-1
Culver Cadet LCA (LFA)
Culver PQ-14 Cadet
Fleet 7
Funk Model B
Great Lakes 2T-1A
Hall Cherokee II
Monoprep
Mooney M-18 Mite
Morrisey Bravo
Pietenpol Aircamper
Pietenpol Sky Scout
Piper L-4 Cub
Porterfield CP-40
Rearwin Cloudster
Rearwin Skyranger 190F
Rearwin Sportster
Republic RC-3 Seabee
Rose Parakeet A-1
Ryan STA
Ryan PT-22 Recruit
Smith DSA-1 Miniplane
Stinson 10
Stinson Junior S
Volmer VJ-23 Swingwing
Welch OW-8

See also
Iowa Aviation Museum

References

Aerospace museums in Iowa
Museums in Wapello County, Iowa